The 2002 President's Cup was a men's tennis tournament played on outdoor hard courts in Tashkent in Uzbekistan and was part of the International Series of the 2002 ATP Tour. The tournament ran from 9 September through 14 September 2002. Third-seeded Yevgeny Kafelnikov won the singles title.

Finals

Singles

 Yevgeny Kafelnikov defeated  Vladimir Voltchkov, 7–6(8–6), 7–5.
 It was Kafelnikov's 3rd title of the year and the 51st of his career.

Doubles

 David Adams /  Robbie Koenig defeated  Raemon Sluiter /  Martin Verkerk, 6–2, 7–5.
 It was Adams' 1st title of the year and the 17th of his career. It was Koenig's 2nd title of the year and the 2nd of his career.

See also
 2002 Tashkent Open

References

President's Cup
ATP Tashkent Open
President's Cup
President's Cup